Bronisław "Jerry" Sularz (born January 27, 1942 in Wałbrzych, Poland) was a Polish football (soccer) goalkeeper who spent four seasons in the North American Soccer League, at least two in the American Soccer League and six in Poland.

Sularz began his career in Poland, playing with for Górnik Wałbrzych.  In 1973, he moved to New York Cosmos of the North American Soccer League.  He remained with the team through the 1975 season before spending 1976 with the Boston Minutemen.  In 1977, he moved to the New Jersey Americans of the American Soccer League.  He later played for Garfield Vistula and the Hoboken Travelers, an over 40 team.

References

External links
NASL Stats
1974 Cosmos Team Photo
Obituary

1942 births
2007 deaths
American Soccer League (1933–1983) players
Boston Minutemen players
Connecticut Wildcats soccer players
Garfield Vistula players
Górnik Wałbrzych players
New Jersey Americans (ASL) players
New York Cosmos players
North American Soccer League (1968–1984) players
Polish footballers
Polish expatriate footballers
Vanderbilt Commodores men's soccer players
People from Wałbrzych
Sportspeople from Lower Silesian Voivodeship
Association football goalkeepers
Polish expatriate sportspeople in the United States
Expatriate soccer players in the United States